The Unpuncliegut, also known as the Hunzpunzliegut, were a Native American people who lived along the southern part of the Texas coast; their settlements are known to have been along the mainland shore of the Laguna Madre in the region of today's Cameron and Willacy counties. They are believed to have spoken Coahuiltecan.

References
Handbook of Texas entry

Native American tribes in Texas